is a Japanese ice dancer. With his skating partner, Ayumi Takanami, he is the 2022 Japanese national bronze medalist. With his former skating partner, Utana Yoshida, he is a two-time Japanese national junior ice dance champion (2020, 2021) and a 2020 Winter Youth Olympics champion in the team event.

Personal life 
Shingo Nishiyama was born on January 24, 2002, in Tokyo, Japan. He has an older sister. Nishiyama's favorite subjects in school are Japanese history and world history. He attended Hinode Gakuen, a correspondence school recommended by fellow Japanese ice dancer Aru Tateno. Nishiyama was accepted into Waseda University's School of Human Sciences to study sports education and psychology, as he wants to become a skating coach. He is related to Japanese ballerina Akane Takada through his mother's side and has worked with her on improving body movement.

Nishiyama has admired Yuzuru Hanyu since he was in elementary school.

Career

Early career 
Nishiyama began skating in 2008 at the age of six, at the suggestion of his first coach Masahiro Kawagoe, who saw him attending a lesson at Citizens' Plaza in Shinjuku, Tokyo. He previously trained with Yutaka Higuchi in Tokyo, and qualified to compete at the Japan Championships each year. He was invited to skate in the gala at the 2013 World Team Trophy as the Japanese national novice champion in the same season.

Nishiyama moved to Canada alone at age 14 to train with Brian Orser, Tracy Wilson, and Ghislain Briand at the Toronto Cricket, Skating and Curling Club, despite not knowing the language. After he suffered a hip injury in the fall of 2018 and was unable to practice jumps, another coach at the club, Andrew Hallam, suggested that he consider switching to ice dance. Despite Nishiyama's initial reluctance to switch disciplines, he drew inspiration from Japanese sprinter Dai Tamesue's book to adjust his mindset.

Nishiyama teamed up with Utana Yoshida in early 2019 after a tryout arranged by the Japan Skating Federation in the fall of 2018, and she moved to train with him and his coaches at the Toronto Cricket, Skating and Curling Club in Canada in February 2019. He continues to train singles simultaneously with ice dance.

2019–2020 season 
In their first season as a partnership, Yoshida/Nishiyama placed sixth at both 2019 JGP United States and 2019 JGP Italy. They then won gold at the Western Sectional and advanced to the 2019–20 Japan Junior Championships, where they again won gold, ahead of Ayumi Takanami / Yoshimitsu Ikeda. As a result, Yoshida/Nishiyama were assigned to the 2020 World Junior Championships and the 2020 Winter Youth Olympics. They were invited to skate in the gala at the 2019 NHK Trophy as junior national champion.

At the 2020 Winter Youth Olympics, Yoshida / Nishiyama placed sixth in the ice dance event with a new personal best, following a sixth-place rhythm dance and a fourth-place free dance. They were chosen by draw to be part of Team Courage for the mixed-NOC team event, alongside singles' skaters Arlet Levandi of Estonia and Ksenia Sinitsyna of Russia and pairs team Alina Butaeva / Luka Berulava of Georgia. Yoshida/Nishiyama won the free dance portion of the team event, ahead of both the silver and bronze medalists from the individual ice dance event, to help Team Courage win the gold medal.

Yoshida/Nishiyama set a goal of being in the top ten at the 2020 World Junior Championships.  They placed twelfth in Tallinn.

2020–2021 season 
Due to the COVID-19 pandemic, the Junior Grand Prix, where Yoshida/Nishiyama would have competed, was cancelled. In November, they won their second consecutive junior national title at the 2020–21 Japan Junior Championships.

Yoshida/Nishiyama announced their split in January 2021. Nishiyama indicated that he would continue in ice dance, rather than returning to singles. In March 2021, he announced his new partnership with fellow Waseda University skater Ayumi Takanami.

2021–2022 season 
Takanami/Nishiyama made their competitive debut at the 2021–22 Japan Championships, winning the bronze medal.

2022–2023 season 
Nishiyama competed in the men's singles during the 2022-23 season but will be aiming for the Olympics in ice dance starting in the 2023-24 season.

Programs

With Yoshida

Men's singles

Competitive highlights 
JGP: Junior Grand Prix

Ice dance with Takanami

Ice dance with Yoshida

Men's singles

Detailed results

With Yoshida

Junior results

References

External links 
 
 

2002 births
Living people
Japanese male ice dancers
Japanese male single skaters
Sportspeople from Tokyo
Figure skaters at the 2020 Winter Youth Olympics